Suvarnangi (pronounced , meaning the golden bodied one) is a rāgam in Carnatic music (musical scale of South Indian classical music). It is the 47th melakarta rāgam in the 72 melakarta rāgam system of Carnatic music. It is called Souveeram or Sauviram in Muthuswami Dikshitar school of Carnatic music.

Structure and Lakshana

It is the 5th rāgam in the 8th chakra Vasu. The mnemonic name is Vasu-Ma. The mnemonic phrase is sa ra gi mi pa dhi nu. Its  structure (ascending and descending scale) is as follows (see swaras in Carnatic music for details on below notation and terms):
: 
: 

Its swaras are shuddha rishabham, sadharana gandharam, prati madhyamam, chathusruthi dhaivatham and kakali nishadham. As it is a melakarta rāgam, by definition it is a sampoorna rāgam (has all seven notes in ascending and descending scale). It is the prati madhyamam equivalent of Kokilapriya, which is the 11th melakarta.

Janya rāgams 
Suvarnangi has a few minor janya rāgams (derived scales) associated with it. See List of janya rāgams for full list of rāgams associated with Suvarnangi.

Compositions
A few compositions set to Suvarnangi rāgam are:

Sarasa souveera by Muthuswami Dikshitar
Iha para sukha by Koteeswara Iyer
Jaya Jaganmayi by Rukminibai Thampuratti
Sri raghupathim by Dr. M. Balamuralikrishna

Related rāgams
This section covers the theoretical and scientific aspect of this rāgam.

Suvarnangi's notes when shifted using Graha bhedam, yields no other melakarta rāgam. Graha bhedam is the step taken in keeping the relative note frequencies same, while shifting the shadjam to the next note in the rāgam.

Notes

References

Melakarta ragas